Springfield Center Elementary School is a historic elementary school located at Springfield Center in Otsego County, New York.  It was built in 1958, and is a one-story, "L"-shaped, Modern Movement style school building.  It is a steel frame building faced in brick and with a flat roof.  It features long continuous bands of windows. The school closed in 1989, and the building houses the town court, offices, and library.

It was listed on the National Register of Historic Places in 2011.

References

School buildings on the National Register of Historic Places in New York (state)
Modern Movement architecture in the United States
School buildings completed in 1958
Schools in Otsego County, New York
National Register of Historic Places in Otsego County, New York